Raphael J. Keller (February 6, 1936 – March 8, 2018) was a Canadian professional ice hockey player who played three games in the National Hockey League for the New York Rangers. He played 737 games for the Hershey Bears of the American Hockey League and was the captain of the Bears in final two seasons from 1971 to 1974. His number was retired by the Bears.

References

External links

1936 births
2018 deaths
Baltimore Clippers players
Canadian ice hockey defencemen
Ice hockey people from Saskatchewan
New York Rangers players
People from Rural Municipality Buffalo No. 409, Saskatchewan